The inverted hammer is a type of candlestick pattern found after a downtrend and is usually taken to be a trend-reversal signal. The inverted hammer looks like an upside down version of the Inverted * symbol pattern, and when it appears in an uptrend is called a shooting star.

Pattern 
The pattern is made up of a candle with a small lower body and a long upper wick which is at least two times as large as the short lower body.  The body of the candle should be at the low end of the trading range and there should be little or no lower wick in the candle. 
 
The long upper wick of the candlestick pattern indicates that the buyers drove prices up at some point during the period in which the candle was formed, but encountered selling pressure which drove prices back down to close near to where they opened. When encountering an inverted hammer, traders often check for a higher open and close on the next period to validate it as a bullish signal.

See also
 Shooting star — Inverted hammer pattern found in an up

External links
 Inverted hammer at onlinetradingconcepts.com
 Inverted Hammer Information at candlecharts.com

Candlestick patterns